Bernardino Giraud (born 14 July 1721 in Rome, died 5 May 1782) was a Cardinal of the Catholic Church. He served as Apostolic Nuncio to France from 1767 to 1773, and as Archbishop of Ferrara from 1773 until his resignation in 1777. He was elevated to Cardinal in pectore on 17 June 1771, and installed as Cardinal-Priest of SS. Trinità al Monte Pincio in 1773. He participated in the Papal conclave, 1774–1775.

Episcopal succession

Giraud was ordained a bishop by Pope Clement XIII on 26 April 1767, being appointed as titular Archbishop of Damascus. Having himself consecrated Alessandro Mattei to the episcopacy, Cardinal Giraud is in the episcopal lineage of Pope Francis.

References

External links
Profile of Giraud at Catholic Hierarchy.org 

18th-century Italian cardinals
1721 births
1782 deaths
Roman Catholic archbishops in Italy
Bishops of Ferrara